Racing Professionals was a racing team owned by Indy Racing League/IndyCar Series driver Jon Herb. Herb formed the team in the middle of the 2001 season and competed in a total of eight races at the end of that season and the 2002 season. In 2004 the team fielded a car for Herb in three events in the Infiniti Pro Series. In 2005 Herb ran the full IPS season, highlighted by winning the Phoenix race.

The team competed in the 2007 Indianapolis 500 as Herb filed an entry on March 29. The team also fielded a second car in conjunction with Hemelgarn Racing for driver Richie Hearn. Herb also competed in the Texas Motor Speedway and Michigan International Speedway races during the 2007 season. Herb sold the team's chassis to the League for redistribution to former Champ Car teams after 2008's open wheel unification.

Complete IRL IndyCar Series results
(key) (Results in bold indicate pole position; results in italics indicate fastest lap)

 In conjunction with Hemelgarn Racing.

External links
Team stats at IRL World

2001 establishments in the United States
2008 disestablishments in the United States
IndyCar Series teams
American auto racing teams
Indy Lights teams